Created in 2002, SPoW -Science Parks of Wallonia-, is an association of seven Belgian science parks located in Wallonia:

 Louvain-la-Neuve Science Park
 Liège Science Park
 Crealys Science Park
 Aéropole Science Park
 Initialis Science Park
 Qualitis Science Park
 Novalis Science Park

The main objectives of the network are:

 To take part to the regional development and the innovation process 
 To ensure the promotion of the Science Parks
 To foster relationships and collaborations between the innovative companies located on the Parks.

The business incubators of the parks also provide a whole set of services to fledgling spin-offs.

The seven University-related research parks are currently home to more than 600 companies and 13500 employees.

See also
 Agoria
 Science and technology in Wallonia

Sources
 Les parc scientifiques wallons 
 SPoW Quality Charter

References

External links
 Science Parks of Wallonia

Organizations established in 2002
Economy of Belgium
Scientific organisations based in Belgium
Wallonia
Wallonia
2002 establishments in Belgium